Park Hui-suk (born 14 December 1945) is a South Korean sprinter. She competed in the women's 4 × 100 metres relay at the 1964 Summer Olympics.

References

External links
 

1945 births
Living people
Athletes (track and field) at the 1964 Summer Olympics
South Korean female sprinters
Olympic athletes of South Korea
Place of birth missing (living people)
Olympic female sprinters